KBS America is an American television channel operated by the U.S. subsidiary of the Korean Broadcasting System, targeting Koreans in North and South America. Launched on October 6, 2005, it runs a broadcasting schedule separate from KBS World in South Korea.

A Canadian variant of this version, broadcast across Canada, is operated by All TV Inc.

Broadcast availability

Digital broadcast

References

External links 
 KBS America 

World United States
Television networks in the United States
Korean-language television stations
Television channels and stations established in 2005